The Río Paz  is a river in southern Guatemala. Its sources are located in the Quezalapa mountains in the north of Jutiapa.

It flows through the Ahuachapán Department and into the Laguna el Espino.

References

Rivers of El Salvador
Rivers of Guatemala
El Salvador–Guatemala border
International rivers of North America
Border rivers